Samuel Walusimbi (born 1948) is a former cricketer from Uganda. He played three One Day Internationals (ODI) in the 1975 cricket World Cup, representing the East Africa cricket team. Walusimbi was one of the founding members of the Wanderers Cricket Club, the second-oldest cricket club in Uganda, won the top flight cricket league in Uganda in 1993, and was part of the Nomads cricket team that toured Kenya and Uganda in 2005. In 2007, he was the coach of the Uganda national cricket team and in 2016 he was named the Nile Special-Uganda Sports Press Association Legendary award winner.

His son Tendo Mbazzi also played international cricket for Uganda.

References

External links
 Interview with Samuel Walusimbi

1948 births
Living people
East African cricketers
East Africa One Day International cricketers
Ugandan cricketers
Cricketers at the 1975 Cricket World Cup
Coaches of the Uganda national cricket team
East and Central Africa cricketers
Ugandan cricket coaches